Anthony Karl English (born 19 October 1966) is an English former professional footballer who played as a defender for Colchester United in the Football League.

Career
Born in Luton, as a junior he played for Coventry City before joining the Colchester United youth setup and then progressing to a professional contract with the club. English played 351 league games and 45 cup games in defence for Colchester United between 1984 and 1996, captaining the side to a Conference and FA Trophy double. At the end of the 2006–07 season, he was inducted into the Colchester United Hall of Fame as one of the first five inductees, with a special ceremony held on the Layer Road pitch at the last game of the season against Crystal Palace.

Honours
Colchester United
 Football Conference winner: 1991–92
 Football Conference runner-up: 1990–91
 FA Trophy winner: 1991–92

References 

1966 births
Living people
Footballers from Luton
English footballers
Association football defenders
Coventry City F.C. players
Colchester United F.C. players
Sudbury Town F.C. players
Heybridge Swifts F.C. players
Witham Town F.C. players
Harwich & Parkeston F.C. players
Halstead Town F.C. players
English Football League players
National League (English football) players